Kovachevo is a village in southern Bulgaria, located in the municipality of Radnevo in the Stara Zagora Province.

Kovachevo is the location of the Maritsa Iztok-2 power station. This power station was ranked as the industrial facility that is causing the highest damage costs to health and the environment in Bulgaria and the entire European Union.

References

Villages in Stara Zagora Province